Percik Pesona (Stain of Enchantment) is a 1979 album by Indonesian singer Chrisye and is his third album and the second with Musica Studios. The album was received poorly, with Chrisye later  reflecting that he had undergone second album syndrome.

Production
Percik Pesona was Chrisye's second solo album and fifth album overall. It was produced after the massive success of Chrisye's debut solo album Sabda Alam (Nature's Order) and soon after the death of Amin Widjaja, one of the founders of Musica Studios. Songwriting was handled by Chrisye, Jockie Soerjoprajogo, and Guruh Soekarnoputra. Backing vocals were provided by rising star Rafika Duri. Chrisye, although shocked by Amin's passing and feeling little passion for the music, provided the vocals, mixing pop and jazz; he also hit high notes on "Kehidupanku" ("My Life').

Three drummers played on the album. Chrisye's childhood friend Keenan Nasution played drums on "Kehidupanku", while Jimmy Manopo played drums on "Angkuh" ("Arrogance"); Fariz RM played drums for the rest of the album. The title of the song was decided by a vote.

Release and reception
Percik Pesona was released in 1979, with Chrisye's favourite "Lestariku" ("My Eternity") as its first single. "Dewi Khayal" ("Goddess of Fantasy") and "Angkuh" were later released as further singles. The album was poorly received.

After the failure of the album, Chrisye asked several other artists why Percik Pesona could have failed so badly. In reply, they said that the failure was two-fold. Firstly, new singers with successful first albums often emulate only the positive aspects of the first release, assuming that those are the reason it was successful; they were also under pressure to succeed. In his biography, Chrisye retrospectively suggested that he should have known that the album would do poorly when he felt no passion for it.

Track listing

References
Footnotes

Bibliography

1979 albums
Chrisye albums
Indonesian-language albums